The Harris Street Bridge is a historic truss bridge that spans the Taunton River off Dean Street in Taunton, Massachusetts.  Built in 1887, it is the oldest surviving bridge in the city, and was built as part of the one of the city's earliest public works projects after incorporation as a city.  It was added to the National Register of Historic Places in 1984.  It is closed to traffic, and is in disrepair.

Description and history
The Harris Street Bridge is located southeast of the junction of Dean Street (United States Route 44) and River Street in eastern Taunton. Dean Street parallels the Taunton River. When the bridge was built in 1887, it crossed on Harris Street, which is now dead-ended on the south bank of the river to the east. The truss elements are wrought iron and are fastened together by pins.

The bridge was built in 1887 by the Pennsylvania Bridge Company, and is one of only two known bridges in Massachusetts built by them.  Its principal purpose was to carry a water main from the nearby Harris Street Pumping Station to the center of the city. Its secondary function was as a road and pedestrian bridge.

The bridge has been closed to vehicular and pedestrian traffic for many years and its deck and railings are in serious disrepair. It still serves its original primary function, carrying a water pipe over the Taunton River.

See also
National Register of Historic Places listings in Taunton, Massachusetts
List of crossings of the Taunton River
List of bridges on the National Register of Historic Places in Massachusetts

References

External links
Bridgehunter.com listing

National Register of Historic Places in Taunton, Massachusetts
Road bridges on the National Register of Historic Places in Massachusetts
Bridges over the Taunton River
Buildings and structures in Taunton, Massachusetts
Bridges completed in 1887
Bridges in Bristol County, Massachusetts
Wrought iron bridges in the United States
Pratt truss bridges in the United States